Field day may refer to:
 For the armed forces use and its derivatives, see wiktionary:field day
 Field day (agriculture), a trade show
 Field Day (amateur radio), an annual amateur radio exercise
 Field Day (band), a Canadian pop-punk band from Calgary, Alberta
 Field Day (festival), a music festival in London
 Field Day (Sydney festival), an outdoor music festival held every year on New Years Day in Sydney
 Field Day Theatre Company, Irish theatre and publishing company 
 Field Day (Dag Nasty album)
 Field Day (Marshall Crenshaw album)
 Field Day (Anthony Phillips album)
 Sports day, a competitive event held by schools
 Club Day, an English community celebration
 "Field Day", a 1991 episode of the PBS show Shining Time Station

See also
 Field trip
 Excursion